Suyash Tilak (born 10 January 1989) is an Indian film and television actor. He is known for playing Jayram Khanolkar in Ka Re Durava and also in BaapManus, Sakhya Re, Durva and Shubhmangal Online.

Personal life 
He is married to Aayushi Bhave.

Early life and career 
Suyash was born on 10 January 1989 in Pune, Maharashtra. He completed his education as an Environmentalist from Fergusson University in Pune. His television debut was on the Zee Marathi serial Amar Prem. In 2011, He did a small role in Pudhcha Paaul. In 2013, He played the lead role in Durva. In 2014, he took on a lead role as Jayram in Ka Re Durava. In 2017, He has appeared in Sakhya Re. In the same year he appeared in BaapManus a serial on Zee Yuva. In 2020, he featured in Khali Peeli and in Shubhmangal Online a TV series on Colors Marathi.

Media image

Filmography

Films

Television

Theatre
 Strawberry – 2016
 Mi, Swara Aani Te Dogha — 2021

Webseries
 Shock Katha (2017)
 Twist Eat (2018)
 Boomerang (2019)

References

External links 
 Official Website
 Suyash Tilak on IMDb
Suyash Tilak on Instagram

Marathi actors
Living people
1987 births
Male actors in Marathi television
Male actors in Marathi cinema
Male actors in Hindi cinema
Indian male soap opera actors